Incest as either a thematic element or an incidental element of the plot, can be found in numerous films and television programs.

Film

Incestuous families or several kinds of incest in one film or a film series
The American horror films The Texas Chainsaw Massacre (original series 1974–1994 and remake series 2003–2006) and Wrong Turn (2003) feature villains who are the product of inbreeding.
Two of the shorts of the anthology film Immoral Tales (1973) deal with incest. The first story features two cousins who have sex by the beach. The fourth story features a fictionalized Lucrezia Borgia having sex with her brother and father; the short ends with the baptism of Lucrezia's baby, implied to be fathered by her own father.
In the musical The Rocky Horror Show and the film The Rocky Horror Picture Show (1975), Riff Raff (Richard O'Brien) and Magenta (Patricia Quinn) are revealed to be brother and sister who have a sexual relationship. In the unproduced sequel Revenge of the Old Queen, it is implied that Dr. Frank-N-Furter had been incestuously involved with his own mother, the "Old Queen" of the planet Transsexual (in the galaxy of Transylvania); she dies in the throes of seducing her own grandson.
The sequel to Richard O'Brien's The Rocky Horror Picture Show is a musical called Shock Treatment which meets Brad and Janet some time after their adventure with Frank 'n' Furter. In this film, brother and sister Cosmo and Nation McKinley are clearly displayed as having a sexual relationship. The film includes a bedroom scene between the two during the song "Lullaby". These two siblings are, as in The Rocky Horror Picture Show, played by O'Brien and Quinn.
Several films directed by Walter Hugo Khouri deal with incest:
In Eros, The God of Love (1981), the protagonist recounts several of the woman he has lusted after. One is his mother, with whom he had an attraction to as a boy. One of his extramarital lovers reminds him of then-two-year-old daughter that shares the same name. When his daughter grows into a young woman, he ogles at her when she wears a revealing swimsuit.
Love Strange Love (1982) focuses on the attraction between a boy and his mother, culminating in them having sex towards the end of the film.
In I (1986), a hypersexual millionaire Marcelo lives with several prostitutes to satisfy his sex drive, however he had been secretly lusting after his daughter Berenice since she was a child. During an island getaway vacation with his prostitutes, Berenice, now a young woman, visits the island with her friend. When the prostitutes and Berenice's friend leave the island, Marcelo and Berenice lift up the mood by arranging a romantic dinner between the two of them. That night, Berenice and Marcelo have sex, and they become secret lovers when they leave the island.
In Forever (1991), wealthy but philandering businessman Marcelo dies having sex, leading his estranged daughter Berenice to investigate her father's death by interrogating all of his former lovers. Berenice reveals to one of Marcelo's lovers, her childhood friend Ana, that her father had molested her during a cliffside getaway. Berenice is revealed to be her father's final sexual partner; she had visited Marcelo after not seeing each other after a long time. The father and daughter confess their longtime feelings for each other and they have sex, but Marcelo suddenly dies from a fatal heart attack. Berenice's investigation was closure for her complicated relationship with her father.
The pornographic Taboo film series of the 1980s deals exclusively with incest, including father-daughter, mother–son and brother–sister.
The sex report Schulmädchen-Report series of the 1970s feature segments which deal with incest: the third film features a girl who has sex with her father to save her parents' marriage; the fourth film features a girl who was internally torn for desiring her brother before successfully seducing him; the fifth film features a girl blackmailing her grandfather into having a sexual affair with her; the ninth film shows a man forcing his stepdaughter to have sex with him; and the twelfth film features a girl who has a crush on her older brother, and they have sex in the segment's conclusion.
The Greek art film Singapore Sling (1990), directed by Nikos Nikolaidis, is about a BDSM-related mother–daughter incestuous relationship. The daughter was raped by her father.
In the film Kate & Leopold (2001), Stuart Bessers' (Liev Schreiber) ex-girlfriend Kate McKay (Meg Ryan) is revealed to be his close ancestor, as she is destined to travel back in time to marry another of Stuart's ancestors, Leopold (Hugh Jackman).
In Jan Dara (2001), the titular character's family has several sexual relations with each other. Jan's sex-addicted father Khun Luang takes his sister-in-law Waad as a sexual partner. Waad gives birth to Luang's daughter, Kaew. Jan eventually falls in love with his Aunt Waad and later has an affair with his father's mistress Boonlueang. Jan is revealed to be a product of his mother's rape, which makes him and Kaew merely cousins. When Kaew becomes pregnant, she is forced into a loveless marriage with Jan. Jan deduces that her baby's father is her own father Luang, who began forcing his now-adult daughter to have sex with him. Jan and Kaew eventually share in having sex with Boonlueang. Jan begins raping Kaew so he can have his own child; she later falls pregnant with Jan's baby which she aborts.
In the film Van Helsing (2004), Count Dracula (Richard Roxburgh) intends to make a young Gypsy princess, Anna Valerious (Kate Beckinsale), his newest bride, both of them knowing that Dracula and Anna are related.
Dracula is a son of a knight named Valerius and Anna is Valerius's descendant. Because Dracula did not have children (when he lived as a human), Anna must be a descendant of his unnamed brother or sister, which makes her Dracula's distant niece.
In Park Chan-Wook's Oldboy (2003), the primary antagonist was outed of having a brother-sister relationship; he ultimately tricks the protagonist to have sex with his long-lost daughter as revenge.
In the 2013 American remake, the antagonist and his sister have instead an incestuous relationship with their father, though the overall revenge plan of the protagonist being tricked into having sex with his long-lost daughter is retained.
The film Borat: Cultural Learnings of America for Make Benefit Glorious Nation of Kazakhstan (2006) features Borat Sagdiyev (Sacha Baron Cohen) as an incestuous journalist, also featuring his whole village in Kazakhstan living under an incestuous way of life.
The action film Machete (2010), features a porn star wannabe named April (Lindsay Lohan) filming pornographic home movies with her mother June (Alicia Marek) involving incestuous lesbian scenes with each other and/or threesomes. April's father Michael Booth (Jeff Fahey) confesses to Padre that he frequently has impure thoughts about his daughter and is disturbed by this. 
In the sequel Machete Kills (2013), Desdemona (Sofia Vergara) reveals to one of her torture victims that as a child, she had been raped by her father.
In A Cure for Wellness (2016), a baron, the film's primary antagonist, marries and has a daughter with his sister. The baron then marries their daughter after her first menstrual cycle in the hopes of continuing to keep his bloodline pure.
 The Other Lamb (2019) focuses on a polygamist cult where the male Shepard leads his all female followers in a peaceful environment who are separated from wives and sisters. The perverted Shepard later grows tired of his wives and desires his young sisters as replacements which resulted to him killing their mothers. The sisters later kill him as revenge for his abuse.
 Barbarian (2022) reveals the father of the deformed antagonist kidnapped and raped women, and would rape the resulting children. The antagonist is revealed to be the product of this multigenerational incest.

Siblings
Instances of incest between siblings.

Historical films
Anne of the Thousand Days (1969), when Anne Boleyn is on trial for treason by adultery, her own brother (among many others) is accused of being her lover. This theme is also used in The Other Boleyn Girl (2008), where Anne Boleyn (Natalie Portman), in pure desperation to be with a child, asks her own brother George (Jim Sturgess) to have sex with her. At first, George agrees for the sake of Anne's safety, but as they prepare, they both realize they cannot go through with this. They are both later charged with incest, and although innocent, they are both sentenced to death.
Incest is also a main plot device in the drama film Caligula (1979), in which the title character (Malcolm McDowell) has sexual relations with his sisters.
In Hamlet (1990), King Claudius (Alan Bates) murders his brother, Hamlet's father, by poisoning him so he could take his sister-in-law Queen Gertrude (Glenn Close) as his bride. Hamlet (Mel Gibson) is disgusted by this turn of events as well as his discovering his mother's incestuous affair with his uncle and plots revenge. The film also hints at the Oedipal relationship between Hamlet and Queen Gertrude as depicted in the "bedroom scene" with the fight between mother and son culminating in a rather passionate kiss given the unhealthy attraction between the two.

Fantasy and horror films
In the film Excalibur (1981), Mordred is Arthur's illegitimate son born by his half-sister Morgana (who enchanted him to make him believe he was laying with his wife Guinevere).
In the film Cat People (1982), Irena Gallier and her brother Paul are descended from an ancient, incestuous race of werecats. Paul wants Irena to become his mate, for if they make love with an ordinary human, they will transform into a black panther and can only change back by killing a human.
In the film Amityville II: The Possession (1982), the possessed Sonny starts an incestuous relationship with his sister, Patricia.
In the film The Hamiltons (2006), Wendell and his twin sister, Darlene, have an incestuous relationship and share it openly.
In the horror fantasy film Tamara (2005), the protagonist Tamara suffers from constant verbal abuse from her alcoholic father Mr. Riley who is discovered to have incestuous fantasies towards his own daughter. Once she discovers this, Tamara compels him with her witchcraft to "finish" his whole beer bottle, causing his death.
In the medieval horror film Red Riding Hood (2011), adapted by Catherine Hardwicke, Lucie fell in love with a blacksmith named Henry Lazar and wanted to marry him (which according to tradition, the firstborn are to be the first to marry to their sweethearts) but she was forbidden by her mother Suzette to do so as she was Adrian Lazar's illegitimate daughter, who was her mother's lover, making her Henry's half-sister.
In the film Crimson Peak (2015), Lady Lucille Sharpe has been carrying on an incestuous relationship with her younger brother Sir Thomas Sharpe since they were children. Their relationship resulted in a sickly child who died soon after birth.
In the fantasy adventure film Zathura: A Space Adventure (2005), the rebellious older sister Lisa (Kristen Stewart) first meets the mysterious Astronaut (Dax Shepard) when the house was under attack by the Zorgons. She is scared but the Astronaut assures her to trust him and that everything will be okay. Taken by surprise by his blue eyes, Lisa agrees with him and tells him that she will never leave him. He leaves to take out the Zorgons, and Lisa takes shelter with her brothers. Having become infatuated with the Astronaut, Lisa comments on feeling safe and protected by him, noting also that "He has such gorgeous eyes", much to her brothers Walter and Danny's dismay. Walter tells her to not to try to get so close to the Astronaut but she does not listen. It is not until after Walter wishes for the Astronaut to have his brother back, who just happens to be Danny, that she's shocked to realize that the Astronaut is her younger brother Walter, from 15 years into the future.
In the cult film The Rocky Horror Picture Show (1975), Riff Raff and Magenta have an implied incestuous relationship.
 In the 2016 Mexican-French horror film We Are the Flesh (Spanish: Tenemos la carne), when an unknown apocalypse has devastated the globe, forcing siblings Lucio and Fauna to forage for food and shelter in a hostile environment. They happen to come across Mariano who demands the siblings have sex with one another while he watches and masturbates.
 In The Witch (2015), Thomasin's brother Caleb represents the sin of Lust as evident when he stares into his sister's dress to see her breasts.

Other films
In Vixen! (1968), the lead character, Vixen (Erica Gavin), has sex with her brother, Judd (Jon Evans).
In Summerfield (1977), siblings Jenny (Elizabeth Alexander) and David (John Waters) are caught having sex near the end of the film by the protagonist Simon (Nick Tate).
In The Hotel New Hampshire (1984), John (Rob Lowe) feels intense sexual desire for his sister, Franny (Jodie Foster). Franny succumbs and, after spending an entire day having sex, they move on to a strictly platonic relationship.
In Flowers in the Attic (1987), a film adaptation of the V.C. Andrews novel of the same name, four siblings discover that they are the product of an incestuous relationship, following the death of their father and that their parents were uncle and niece. The film differs from the novel in that the two eldest siblings, Cathy and Chris Dollanganger, do not embark on a relationship. However, the 2014 adapted television film sees the inclusion of a sexual relationship between Cathy and Chris. Following the 2014 version, three television films, Petals on the Wind, If There Be Thorns, and Seeds of Yesterday, all based on the Dollanganger book series, see the continued relationship of Cathy and Chris, and the birth of their children.
In Close My Eyes (1991), siblings Richard (Clive Owen) and Natalie (Saskia Reeves) begin a passionate love affair, even while Natalie marries another man.
In Return to the Blue Lagoon (1991), based on the novel The Garden of God, adoptive siblings Richard Lestrange and Lilli Hargrave grow up as lovers and have a child after being marooned on a tropical island for many years, just as Richard's real parents had done before them.
In The Cement Garden (1993), siblings Jack and Julie begin an incestuous relationship after the death of their mother.
In Fun (1994), Hilary reveals to Bonnie that her father is in prison for having an affair with her and Bonnie recounts of how joking around with her brother turned into intercourse, and that she has kept this to herself.
In Angels & Insects (1996), the hero discovers that his wife has been participating in an incestuous affair with her brother which began when they were young, and that all of his children are in fact not his own, but rather the product of the incestuous union.
Julien Donkey-Boy (1999) stars Julien (Ewen Bremner) and his disturbing life and family. Toward the film's ending, it is revealed that his sister Pearl (Chloë Sevigny) is pregnant as a result of an incestuous action between the two of them.
In L.I.E (2001), One of Howie Blitzer's friends also his age, Kevin, has an incestuous relationship with his sister during a time when they are all discovering their sexuality. He clearly states that "she won't fuck anyone else".
In The Dreamers, twins Isabelle (Eva Green) and Theo (Louis Garrel) share an incestuous relationship. 
In Harold and Kumar Escape from Guantanamo Bay (2008), Harold and Kumar are hiding from the FBI since they are accused of having been terrorists. They hide with a couple who turn out to be brother and sister and they tell Harold and Kumar to stay in the basement with their kid. But the guys get scared when they see that the kid is one-eyed.
In Dogtooth (2009), a couple keep their adult children ignorant of the world. At some point, they make their son choose one of his two sisters. He fondles them, eyes closed, then chooses the elder one and has sex with her.
In The Unspeakable Act (2012), the 17-year-old protagonist Jackie Kimball is deeply in love with her 18-year-old brother Matthew, and he, though moderately accepting of the fact, does not reciprocate.
In Clueless (1995), former step-siblings Cherilyn "Cher" Horowitz (Alicia Silverstone) and Josh Lucas (Paul Rudd) fall in love and begin a relationship together.
In Not Another Teen Movie (2001), Jake Wyler (Chris Evans) attempts to avoid any physical contact with his younger sister Catherine Wyler (Mia Kirshner), who is sexually attracted to him and makes various attempts to win his affection, even going so far as to dance seductively with him as his love interest Janey Briggs (Chyler Leigh) watches. After her mother dies, Janey has to take over her responsibilities, including "cooking, cleaning, breastfeeding Mitch", Mitch being own her baby brother.
In Joe Dirt (2001), Joe meets a seductive woman named Jill (Jaime Pressley) who shares the same interests and hobbies with him; events eventually lead to them making out, during which Jill tells how she was abandoned by her parents at a bus stop, in turn causing Joe to worry that Jill could be his long-lost sister. However, he has sex with her first before telling her he can not see her anymore because she's his sister. Jill clears up this misunderstanding and they resume having sex — which turns out to be a disaster, as Joe finds he is aroused only because he wants Jill to be his sister; whereupon they both agree and succeed in passionate lovemaking, shouting in ecstasy: "I'm your sister! You're my sister!"
In High School Musical (2006) and the film's two sequels, a close (and seemingly incestuous) relationship is hinted at between popular students Sharpay Evans and her twin brother/partner-in-crime, Ryan Evans, as both twins are often shown singing love songs to each other while paired up as love interests in the school's play. Ryan becomes jealous when Sharpay's love for Troy Bolton remains unrequited.
In Illegitimate (2016), two siblings, a brother and sister, have an incestuous love.
In Tromeo and Juliet (1996), star-crossed lovers Tromeo Que and Juliet Cap are discovered to be long-lost brother and sister as revealed by Tromeo's father Monty and Juliet's mother Ingrid; years before when Ingrid was married to Monty, she had an affair with Lord Capulet which resulted in the birth of a son named Tromeo whom Monty raised as his own. Despite this revelation, Tromeo and Juliet share a passionate embrace and continue with their affair, eventually marrying and living happily ever after with six (inbred) children.
In The Royal Tenenbaums (2001), adopted siblings Richie Tenebaum (Luke Wilson) and Margot Tenenbaum (Gwyneth Paltrow) share a secret incestuous love for each other. At first, this love is unrequited due to Margot's marriage to a man named Raleigh and her affair with Richie's best friend and neighbor Eli. Only after discovering through Eli the true extent of Richie's love for her does this lead to a confrontation between the two siblings. Following Richie's suicide attempt they share a kiss.
In The Flower of Evil (2003), step-siblings François and Michèle become incestuous lovers after his return from the United States. Soon after, Michèle is attacked by her drunk and angry stepfather Gérard who attempts to rape her but fails. Also, Michèle's aunt Liné confesses to having loved her own brother a little too closely before his untimely execution by the French Resistance in the Second World War.
In Géminis (2005), twins Jeremías (Lucas Escáriz) and Meme (María Abadi) are in an ongoing sexual relationship while living with their unknowing parents. Their mother eventually catches them in the act, and is distraught with rage as she assaults both of them.
In the Canadian film Blood (2004), an incestuous relationship is implied between estranged siblings Chris (Jacob Tierney) and Noelle (Emily Hampshire), who have a volatile and violent love–hate dynamic.
In The Dark Side of Love (1984), estranged siblings Emilio (Lorenzo Lena) and Patrizia (Monica Guerritore) develop an incestuous relationship when Patrizia moves in with her brother.
In the German film Der Kuß meiner Schwester (2000; Kissing My Sister), siblings Mattis (Florian Heiden) and Mieke (Alexandra Schalaudek), who grew up apart, fall in love and develop a sexual relationship when Mieke moves in with Mattis and their father for the summer. The latter eventually catches them in the act and is angered at first, but later comes to terms with the situation after Mieke runs away and threatens to jump from a moving train.
In the French-Canadian film La coupure (2006; Torn Apart), siblings Christophe (Marc Thibaudeau) and Christine (Valérie Cantin) have had an incestuous relationship since childhood, despite Christine being married with two children. All the while her twelve-year-old daughter Tamara (Vickie Michon-Dagenais), Christophe's niece, is also falling in love with him. It turns out that Tamara already knows about Christophe and Christine's relationship and is jealous of this, while Christine's husband is the last to know and cannot come to terms with his wife's affair.
In Little Sister (1995), estranged siblings Martijn (Romijn Conen) and Daantje (Kim van Kooten) struggle to recall an incestuous moment which happened in their childhood. It is eventually revealed that despite their relationship being sexual in nature, they did not actually have sex.
In the American film Sixteen (1973), an incestuous relationship is implied between siblings Bruvver (John Lozier) and Naomi (Simone Griffeth), who live with their parents on a farm.
In Alpine Fire (1985), siblings Franzi (Thomas Nock) and Belli (Johanna Lier) develop an incestuous relationship while living with their parents on a farm in the Swiss Alps. When Belli becomes pregnant, their father is enraged and tries to shoot them both, but is accidentally shot dead himself after a struggle with Franzi. This happens right in front of their mother, who immediately dies from shock. The siblings are then left to fend for themselves in the middle of winter.
In Bad Family (2010), siblings Daniel (Lauri Tilkanen) and Tilda (Pihla Viitala), who grew up apart, fall in love when Tilda moves in with Daniel and their father. The latter immediately suspects a sexual relationship between the two and goes to extreme measures to keep them apart, but ultimately fails to do so as they run away together.
In Kika (1993), siblings Pablo (Santiago Lajusticia) and Juana (Rossy de Palma) have had an incestuous relationship in the past.
In Marguerite & Julien (2015), siblings Julien (Jérémie Elkaïm) and Marguerite (Anaïs Demoustier) have been in love since childhood, which continues into adulthood and becomes a sexual relationship. After going on the run, they are both arrested and executed. Before this, Marguerite gives birth to a baby, which is taken away in secret by their family to be raised by them.
In Beautiful Kate (2009), Ned (Ben Mendelsohn) returns home with his fiancée to see his dying father on a farm in the Australian outback. Returning home brings up memories of his love affair with his twin sister Kate (Sophie Lowe), and his own tragic role in her death.
In Feed (2017), incest is hinted between fraternal twins Matthew (Tom Felton) and Olivia (Troian Bellisario), who have shared a close relationship since birth. Their bond is so strong that when Matthew dies in a car crash, he comes back to haunt his sister, and Olivia willingly risks having a near-fatal eating disorder in order to continue being in contact with her twin brother.
In Daddy's Home 2 (2017), Dylan kisses his stepsister Adrianna under the mistletoe, much to the shock of both their parents watching.
In The House of Yes (1997), fraternal twins Marty (Josh Hamilton) and Jacqueline (Parker Posey) have an ongoing incestuous relationship.
In Blades of Glory (2007), a pair of twin brother-sister figure skaters are revealed to be lovers. They were played by Will Arnett and Amy Poehler, who were married in real life at the time.
In That's My Boy (2012), Jamie is caught having sex with her twin brother Chad by her fiancé's father Donny, and blackmailed at her wedding. After the siblings announce their relationship to their family, they are chastised but continue their affair. The enraged Todd calls off the wedding and ends his relationship with Jamie.
In How to Draw a Perfect Circle (2009), twins Guilherme (Rafael Morais) and Sofia (Joana de Verona) have sex after promising each other in childhood that they would lose their virginity together.
In the American film Fighting Fish (2010), estranged siblings David (Val Emmich) and Alice (Anna Moore) rekindle a past sexual encounter while living with their younger half-siblings, who remain oblivious to their relationship.
In the Swiss-German film Schwarzer Panther (2014; Black Panther), estranged siblings Jakob (Ole Jacobs) and Emilie (Lucy Wirth) spend time together at a woodland house owned by their late parents. Having had a past attraction towards each other, they begin a sexual relationship despite Emilie having a boyfriend who is out of town.
In Shock Treatment (1981), Cosmo and Nation McKinley (Richard O'Brien and Patricia Quinn) are siblings in an incestuous relationship.
In Rabies (2010), siblings Ofer (Henry David) and Tali (Liat Har-lev) are on the run from their parents, who have found out about their incestuous relationship.
In the American film Sin of Innocence (1986), step-siblings Tim (Dermot Mulroney) and Jenny (Megan Follows) fall in love, causing much turmoil within their respective families.

Incest between half-siblings
In The Crow (1994), the main antagonist Top Dollar (Michael Wincott) and his half-sister Myca (Bai Ling) are revealed to be lovers.
In Homesick (2015), Charlotte (Ine Marie Wilmann) meets her half-brother Henrik (Simon J. Berger) for the first time when they are adults, and they begin having a sexual relationship.
In The Falling (2014), Lydia (Maisie Williams) develops an incestuous relationship with her brother Kenneth (Joe Cole), bonding after the death of her close friend. As the pair have sex for the first time, their mother catches them in the act and forbids the siblings from being together, throwing Kenneth out of the house and threatening Lydia with a pair of scissors. Their mother also reveals that Lydia and Kenneth are only half-siblings, Lydia being the product of rape.
In Drifters (2011), Mete (Andrea Bosca) is seduced by his younger half-sister Belinda (Miriam Giovanelli).
In Shameless (2012), Tadek (Mateusz Kościukiewicz) seduces his older half-sister Anka (Agnieszka Grochowska).
In Delta (2008), half-siblings Mihail (Félix Lajkó) and Fauna (Orsi Tóth) build a cabin in the middle of the Danube river and live together. An incestuous relationship is implied, for which they face vitriolic disdain from their mother and the local community.
In Kaboom (2010), during the climax of the film it is revealed that lovers Smith (Thomas Dekker) and London (Juno Temple) are half-siblings, sharing the same father. This revelation shocks both of them.
In Demonios tus ojos (2017; Sister of Mine), Aurora (Ivana Baquero) is seduced by her older half-brother Oliver (Julio Perillán).
In Spring Night, Summer Night (1967), half-siblings Carl (Ted Heimerdinger) and Jessica (Larue Hall) have sex one night, which leads to Jessica becoming pregnant.
In A Simple Favor (2018), Stephanie (Anna Kendrick) reveals to a friend that she had sex with her half-brother Chris (Dustin Milligan) as a teenager.

Homosexual siblings
A case of consensual incest between adult sisters Christine (Joely Richardson) and Lea (Jodhi May) is portrayed in the English film Sister My Sister (1994), which is based on a true story.
In the film Velvet Goldmine (1998), the singer Curt Wilde (Ewan McGregor) allegedly had an incestuous relationship with his older brother when he was 13. His parents had Wilde start shock treatments to "fry the fairy clean out of him".
The Hours (2002) features a lesbian incest kiss between Virginia Woolf (Nicole Kidman) and her sister Vanessa Bell (Miranda Richardson).
Harry + Max (2004) features an incestuous relationship between two teen idol brothers.
In the film Starcrossed (2005), Darren (J. B. Ghuman Jr.) and Connor (Marshall Allman) are two brothers who, as teenagers, realize that the feelings they have for each other are not just those of brothers.
The film From Beginning to End (2009), features an incestuous relationship between two half-brothers.

Relationship unknown to the characters
Sometimes, two characters do not know about their blood relationship when they enter a sexual or romantic relationship, or one of them knows while the other does not.

In The Empire Strikes Back (1980), Princess Leia kisses Luke Skywalker passionately to make Han Solo jealous, but in Return of the Jedi it is revealed that she and Luke are twin siblings. Before this, in A New Hope Leia kisses Luke "for luck" before swinging across a gap between platform.
At the end of the film Lone Star (1996), Sheriff Sam Deeds (Chris Cooper) and his high school sweetheart and current lover Pilar Cruz (Elizabeth Peña) learn that they are half-siblings, having the same father, Pilar's mother having been Sam's father's mistress.
In the film The King (2005), the main character has a sexual relationship with his pastor's daughter, who then becomes pregnant. He knows, though she does not, that the pastor is also his father and uncle, who had an affair with his mother, making the pastor's daughter his half-sister/cousin.
In Curse of the Golden Flower (2006), a prince and his half-sister unknowingly enter into an incestuous relationship. The film also includes an instance between a woman and her stepson.
In Back to the Future (1985), Marty McFly goes back in time. While saving his own father from being hit by a car, he accidentally disrupts the timing of his parents' first meeting, in the process causing his mother, unaware that Marty is her future son, to fall in love with him instead of his father. The film then deals with Marty's attempts to get his parents to fall in love with each other in order to ensure his own existence, while Lorraine continually falls more in love with him after he saves her from the clutches of Biff Tannen repeatedly. When Marty reluctantly takes Lorraine to a prom dance she manages to passionately kiss him, whereupon she stops and stares at Marty with a shocked expression, feeling that the kiss somehow feels "wrong".

Non-consensual incest
In the film The Shipping News (2001), based on E. Annie Proulx's 1993 novel of the same name, it is revealed that Agnis Hamm was raped by her 15-year-old half-brother Guy Quoyle when she was 12, and terminated the resulting pregnancy.
In Murali K. Thalluri's film 2:37 (2006), high school student Melody is raped and impregnated by her brother, Marcus.
In Daniel & Ana (2009), Daniel and Ana Torres are kidnapped and forced to have sex while being videotaped. After being released, they try to return to their lives and family home as if nothing had happened. But Daniel is unable to cope with or speak to anyone about his feelings. After Ana goes ahead with the marriage to her fiancé, the film culminates in Daniel raping Ana.
In the Peruvian film Dioses (2008; English title: Gods), Diego (Sergio Gjurinovic) is intensely attracted to his older sister Andrea (Anahí de Cárdenas). One night when Andrea is drunk and passed out in bed, Diego fondles and attempts to rape her, but backs down as she starts to wake up.

Parent/offspring incest

Father/daughter incest
In William A. Fraker's film A Reflection of Fear (1972), the main protagonist, 15-year-old Marguerite (Sondra Locke) vies for her father's attention sexually, even to the point of eliminating her mother and grandmother.
In Appassionata (1974), students and close friends Eugenia and Nicola compete for the affections of Eugenia's father Emilio. Eugenia harbors incestuous feelings for her father, who denies her advances, and as a result is rude towards her mentally ill mother Elisa, and later becomes jealous when Nicola and Emilio begin an affair. When Elisa is institutionalized and Emilio brings home Nicola as his lover, Nicola swaps with Eugenia at night in bed, allowing Eugenia to finally have sex with her father without Emilio knowing.
In the film Girl with the Golden Panties (1980), writer Luis (Lautaro Murúa) is seduced by and eventually has sex with his niece Mariana (Victoria Abril). He later realizes she is also his biological daughter, having had a prior affair with Mariana's mother.
The film Vrijdag (1980), directed by and based on the play by Hugo Claus, focuses on a couple trying to reconcile and to cope with life after the husband is released from jail for the charge of having sex with their daughter, who had harbored longtime incestuous feelings for him.
In Butterfly (1982), miner Jess Tyler lives in the Nevada desert and has not seen his daughter Kady for years. He is confronted then seduced by the teenaged Kady, while struggling with his own reluctance as well as the conservative rural society in 1937. He later realizes that she is not his biological daughter as she was born out of his ex-wife's affair.
In the comedy film National Lampoon's Vacation (1983), Cousin Eddie's daughter Vicki reveals on the see-saw that she's already going steady and she can French-kiss, and "Daddy says I'm the best at it", much to her cousin's disgust and confusion.
In the film U Turn (1997), married couple Grace (Jennifer Lopez) and Jake (Nick Nolte) are revealed to be father and daughter. Grace is Jake's daughter who he sexually abused for years, and later married after he killed her mother.
In Eve's Bayou (1997), a young psychic girl named Eve learns from her sister Cisely that although she and her father had a normal yet affectionate relationship, she was abused by him which caused a series of events that led to his death. Eve later reads a letter from her father who claims that Cisely tried to seduce him instead, and he rejected her by hitting her before apologizing. Eve later foresees in the end which is the real truthful event which is kept ambiguous to the viewer.
In Wicked (1998), teenager Ellie (Julia Stiles) attempts to seduce her father Ben (William R. Moses) after her mother dies.
In Visitor Q (2001), a father visits his estranged daughter who had become a prostitute. The daughter seduces her father, who succumbs to her advances and they have sex, although the daughter is disappointed when he climaxes too fast.
In The Ballad of Jack and Rose (2005), Jack Slavin (Daniel Day-Lewis), a widowed man with a heart condition, and his beautiful but unstable daughter Rose (Camilla Belle) maintain a close relationship after her mother left them years before. However, when their relationship is threatened by Jack's new girlfriend Kathleen and her two sons, Rose goes to extreme lengths to get rid of the new family and be with her father, even sharing a kiss with her father when he is asleep.
The film The Quiet (2005) features a sexual incestuous relationship between the protagonist's godfather and his daughter.
In Madeinusa (2006), an indigenous community believes that during Good Friday and Easter Sunday, God is dead and thus cannot see what is happening in the world. This leads to the Mayor of the community having sex with his two daughters.
In Strella (2009), ex-convict Yiorgos meets transgender prostitute Strella, and the two fall in love and begin a relationship. He later learns that Strella is his estranged son-turned-daughter, who had transitioned while he was in prison. Strella later reveals she had trailed Yiorgos and orchestrated events for them to meet, but went through their incestuous relationship without telling him as she had fallen in love with him and saw him more as a stranger than as a father.

Sexual abuse
A notable example of censorship in this area surfaces in Kings Row (1942). While the relationship is explicit in Henry Bellamann's bestselling 1940 novel of the same name, Joseph Breen, director of the Production Code Authority and his superior, Will H. Hays, first president of the Motion Picture Producers and Distributors of America, forbade clearly showing that Dr. Tower (Claude Rains) commits incest with his daughter Cassandra (Betty Field) in the film.
Roman Polanski's Chinatown (1974) features Jake Gitter (Jack Nicholson) character forcing Evelyn Mulwray (Faye Dunaway) to admit if she is the mother or sister of her supposed daughter Katherine. She admits she is both, having been raped by her father, powerful businessman Noah Cross (John Huston), resulting in the birth of Katherine when she was a teenager.
In Beatrice (1987), the titular character is a princess who longs for the return of her father, whom she idolizes and she had not seen since she was a child. He returns as a power-hungry and abusive ruler who regularly attempts to sexually abuse the heartbroken Beatrice. 
In the film Twin Peaks: Fire Walk with Me (1992), a prequel to the television series Twin Peaks, a sexually abusive relationship between father and daughter leads to murder. 
The fact-based television film Shattered Trust: The Shari Karney Story (1993) starred Melissa Gilbert as Shari Karney, an incest victim who was sexually abused by her father.
In Daughter of Darkness (1993), protagonist Mak (Lily Chung) is continuously raped by her father and ends up killing him. She later gives birth to a baby girl, though the father of the child could either be her father or her boyfriend.
In Forrest Gump (1994), the protagonist Forrest Gump discovers that his childhood love interest Jenny Curran (Robin Wright), along with her sisters, has been sexually abused by her widowed alcoholic father, narrating how her daddy was "a loving man. He was always kissing and touching her and her sisters".
The film The Cider House Rules (1999) depicts an abusive father-daughter relationship that results in the daughter's pregnancy.
In the film Dolores Claiborne (1999), based on the 1992 novel of the same name by Stephen King, the troubled writer Selena (Jennifer Jason Leigh) is revealed to have been molested by her alcoholic father Joe, as discovered in a repressed memory in which a young Selena is forced to give her father a handjob.
In Girl, Interrupted (2000), a recently released patient of the mental institution, Daisy Randone (Brittany Murphy), is well known to have been sexually abused by her father. Being taunted over this eventually leads her to commit suicide.
In The Butterfly Effect (2004), a teenage girl named Kayleigh (Amy Smart) is discovered to have been molested by her father (Eric Stoltz) as depicted in flashbacks as he touches her while forcing her to partake in child pornography.
In the film An American Haunting (2005), the curse turns out to be caused by the father having sexually abused his daughter.
In Perfect Stranger (2007), flashbacks reveal convicted killer Rowena (Halle Berry) was sexually abused by her father throughout her childhood, prompting her mother to kill him, and both mother and child to bury his body in the front yard.
In the neo-noir drama Final Analysis (1992), villainess Heather Evans (Kim Basinger) is revealed to have suffered sexual abuse from her father in her early childhood shortly after her mother left the family due to the father's alcoholism. Twice, her father rapes her, leading her to kill him by setting him on fire after he is doused with alcohol.
Tim Roth's film The War Zone (1999) explores the effect of father-daughter incest on a family. 
In Audition (1999), villainess Asami's stepfather sexually abused her when she was a child.
In the murder mystery thriller The Dead Girl (2006), Krista (Brittany Murphy)'s stepfather molested her and was the driving force behind her running away from home as a teenager.
In Ken Park (2002), a teenage girl named Peaches is living alone with her obsessive and overly-religious father, who fixates on her as the embodiment of her deceased mother. After the father catches her and her boyfriend on her bed about to have sex, he savagely disciplines her, forcing her to participate in a quasi-incestuous wedding ritual with him.
In the film El Padrino (2004), Lars (Gary Busey) is an abusive father who forces his teen daughter to have sex with him and to prostitute herself, before he is arrested and then burned alive by a jail mob.
In the American drama film Black Snake Moan (2006), Rae Doole (Christina Ricci)'s promiscuity and hypersexuality are the result of having been sexually abused by her mother's boyfriend all through her adolescent years. 
In Pedro Almodóvar's film Volver (2006), a man lusts after his stepdaughter, who is, in fact, the product of incest between her mother and her mother's father.
In the teen drama independent film Short Term 12 (2009), suspecting her roommate Jayden of having been abused by her father and attempting to harm him in his sleep, Grace (Brie Larson) opens up to Jayden about being sexually abused by her own father, after Jayden shows Grace bruises from where her father hit her.
In the psychological thriller film Horsemen (2009), horse warrior Kristen (Zhang Ziyi) murders her adoptive mother, because her father repeatedly molested her at night, and her mother did nothing to stop him.
In Lee Daniels’ film Precious (2009) a disadvantaged teen girl has been raped by her father, who has AIDS, on a daily basis since the age of three. Precious gives birth to two children as a result. After her father dies, her mother physically, verbally, and sexually abuses Precious until she manages to escape her abusive household. Sadly, she then discovers she is HIV-positive from the abuse inflicted by her late father.
In That Girl in Yellow Boots (2010), Ruth (Kalki Koechlin) travels to India to find her biological Indian father, and takes up work as a masseuse who also gives handjobs for extra pay. She realizes in the end of the film that her father was one of her customers whom she had sexually pleasured, who had joined a pro-incest cult and sought to have sex with his visiting daughter.
In the movie For Colored Girls (2010), the majority of Tangie's scenes have her bringing someone home or escorting them out the door. When her mother shows up and blasts her for sending her younger sister to provider of illegal abortions, in the ensuing confrontation it is revealed that she had been molested by her grandfather, who had also molested her mother.
The Chilean splatter film Hidden in the Woods (2012) and its 2014 American remake features a drug dealer who is the father of two girls. He rapes his elder daughter as a young adolescent, causing her to get pregnant and give birth to her son/brother, who is physically and mentally disfigured in the 2012 film. Years later, he tries to rape his younger daughter as a teenager, causing her sister to call the police and kick off the films' events.
In Home Run (2013), a woman named Karen reveals to a church consulting support group that she was sexually abused by her alcoholic father from as early as five years old. She reveals, as well, that she is unable to bear children.
In That Lovely Girl (2014), the protagonist lives with her father as his secret lover, however her conflicting feelings on their toxic and abusive relationship results in her bulimia.
In Exposed (2016), the protagonist Isabel de La Cruz has suffered child sexual abuse by her father.
In the film Gerald's Game (2017), Jessie (Carla Gugino) recalls a painful memory where her father masturbated to her as she sat on his lap as a child.
In It (2017), based on the novel of the same name, Beverly Marsh suffers constant physical and emotional abuse from her father, Alvin Marsh, who is discovered to be sexually attracted to his own daughter, in the climax he finally attempts to rape her and she accidentally kills him when defending herself.
In An Impossible Love (2018), Chantal is brought by her mother Rachel to meet her wealthy father Philippe so she can be legally acknowledged as her daughter. After being legalized, Chantal begins having regular visits with Philippe and is initially enamored by her father. However, Philippe begins verbally and sexually abusing Chantal during her visits, which becomes a source of trauma for her.
In The Girl in the Basement (2021), which was inspired by the Fritzl case, a teenaged girl is imprisoned by her father inside a concealed area in the cellar of the family home for over twenty years. During this time, she is continuously raped and conceived several children with her father.

Father/son incest
A subplot of the film The Gift (2000) involves a mentally unstable man being abused by his father.
In the film Ken Park (2002), Claude's drunk father attempts to give him oral sex while he's sleeping.
The film Aleksandr's Price (2012) follows a young male prostitute as he gathers clients in New York City, the last client accidentally being his own father.
The film 8½ Women (1999) depicts the relationship of a man with his widowed father.
In the short film The Strange Thing About the Johnsons (2011), the father and son have a sexual relationship in which the son is the abuser.
In the film Daddy (2015), writer Colin and his significantly younger boyfriend Tee realize they are biological father and son.
Inspired by true events from director, writer, and lead actor James Morosini, the cringe comedy film I Love My Dad (2022) features a father's attempt to bond with his son by catfishing as a romantic interest.

Mother/son incest
Alfred Hitchcock's Psycho and the film's three sequels depict an incestuous relationship between Norman Bates and his late unstable mother Norma Bates, who abused him through his childhood up to his teen years. When his mother chooses another lover over him, Norman poisons them both. Then, reeling from his mother's death, he creates a living personality in his head to replace his deceased mother. His own mental conflict causes him to kill any woman toward whom he feels an attraction, fancying that the "Mother" personality has become jealous.
In the political thriller The Manchurian Candidate (1962), the character Raymond Shaw (Laurence Harvey) has an incestuous relationship with his mother (who, in turn, had had an incestuous affair with her father) while in a hypnotized state. One of the film's most notable scenes involves the two of them sharing a passionate kiss. Their relationship is shown more explicitly in the 2004 remake.
In the film The Damned (1969), by Luchino Visconti, the deviant young character of Martin (played by Helmut Berger) besides having paedophilian tendencies, forces his mother Sophie (played by Ingrid Thulin) into having sexual intercourse with him.
In My Lover My Son (1970), by John Newland, the main character (played by Romy Schneider) falls in love with her son (played by Dennis Waterman, who is only 10 years younger).
Murmur of the Heart (French: Le souffle au cœur) (1971) by Louis Malle tells a coming-of-age story about a 15-year-old boy who is growing up in bourgeois surroundings in Dijon, France. The various adventures of the boy lead to an incestuous relationship with his mother.
In Bernardo Bertolucci's film La Luna (a.k.a. Luna) (1979), Jill Clayburgh plays an opera singer on tour in Italy whose desperate attempts to detoxify her drug-addicted son result in an incestuous relationship with the boy.
In the horror film Sleepwalkers (1992), the energy vampires Charles Brady (Brian Krause) and his mother Mary (Alice Krige) maintain an incestuous relationship. 
The Australian film Bad Boy Bubby (1993) depicts an incestuous relationship between a mother and her adult son, who has never been outside his mother's house in his life.
The film Spanking the Monkey (1994) depicts a situation in which mother-son incest takes place, leading the latter to attempt suicide.
The French film Sitcom (1998), by François Ozon, depicts a mother seducing her son in an attempt to "cure" him of his homosexuality.
In Not Another Teen Movie (2001) Jake Wyler's mother (Julie Welch), not wanting to see him alone and miserable, offers herself sexually to her own son as a date for the prom as well as to help him lose his virginity, much to Jake's disgust.
The French film La Petite Lili (2005) portrays a fictional case of incipient consensual mother-son incest between independent adults.
Savage Grace, released in 2007, was modeled on the true story of the dysfunctional incestuous relationship between heiress Barbara Daly Baekeland and her son Antony.
Womb is a literary science fiction film released in 2011. After the death of her lover Thomas, Rebecca (Eva Green) decides to clone him and carry him inside her, eventually giving birth to Thomas' clone. They continue their sexual relationship with each other throughout the film. Upon his adulthood, the cloned Thomas finds out he's a clone and had sex with Rebecca out of confusion and sexual tension, resulting Rebecca to become pregnant with his child/sibling and leave her life.
In Incendies (2010), after the death of Nawal Marwan, a Canadian immigrant, her two children, twins Jeanne and Simon, discover that they are the products of rape and incest: during a civil war, Nawal was imprisoned and raped by torturer Abou Tareq, who in fact unknowingly committed incest, as he was her son Nihad who had been lost or abandoned after birth because he was the result of an "impossible love".
In the Korean film Moebius (2013), a Korean woman, driven mad after discovering her husband's infidelity, exacts revenge by castrating her only son then cannibalizing his penis.
In the film remake Black Christmas (2006), Billy's mother rapes her own son in order to conceive a child. Nine months later, their daughter Agnes is born. Eight years later, Billy gouges out his daughter/sister's eye and kills his mother by beating her to death with a rolling pin, then makes Christmas cookies out of his mother's flesh.
In The Heart Is Deceitful Above All Things, adapted from the novel of the same name, five-year-old Jeremiah is physically and sexually abused by his prostitute mother Sarah.
In Blade (1998), on a mission to kill Frost, the title character is unexpectedly reunited with his mother, Vanessa Brooks (Sanaa Lathan), whom he had long thought to be dead. As a vampire, she shows a more than motherly interest in her own son, thus indicating how depraved she has become since Frost turned her.
In the science fantasy film Jupiter Ascending (2015), the several millennia-old Titus Abrasax (Douglas Booth) attempts to force Jupiter Jones (Mila Kunis), the reincarnation of his mother, to marry him. While he does creepily attempt to charm her, his real motive for marrying her is to become her heir then immediately kill her to get the inheritance.
In Trauma (2017), a female political prisoner in Pinochet's Chile in 1978 is tied nude to a chair with her legs spread open. Her son is brought to her and forced to have sex with her after injection with a drug intended to enhance sexual performance.

Mother/daughter incest
The Greek film Singapore Sling (1990), directed by Nikos Nikolaidis, is concerned with a lesbian mother-daughter relationship.
In the horror drama film Black Swan (2010) about the pressures of maintaining a strict 'perfect' ballet profession, among other things, the film's storyline implies incest inflicted upon Nina (Natalie Portman) by her overprotective mother Erica Sayers (Barbra Hershey), who abuses her mentally and physically on a daily basis.

Stepparents/stepchildren incest
In Lolita (1962) (and its 1997 remake), both based on the 1955 novel of the same title by Vladimir Nabokov, a man and his stepdaughter have a sexual relationship.
In the French film  Beau-père (1981), after the sudden death of his wife, Remy (Patrick Dewaere) is forced to take care of his 14-year-old stepdaughter (Ariel Besse) who, unbeknownst to him, has fallen in love with him. He finally succumbs to the girl's advances and they move out of town and start living as a couple.
The film Mini's First Time (2006) features a sexual relationship between the main character, Mini, and her stepfather, Martin.
In the film Hallam Foe (2008), Hallam (Jamie Bell) suspects his stepmother Verity (Claire Forlani) is responsible for his mother's death. When Verity confronts him about his suspicions, she discovers he secretly fantasises about her. They end up having sex, which leads to Hallam running away from home.
Carl Th. Dreyer's film Day of Wrath (1943) deals with a stepmother-stepson romantic relationship.
In The Diary of a Teenage Girl (2015), teenage protagonist Minnie recklessly initiates an affair with her mother's boyfriend Munroe whilst undergoing her sexual awakening entering high school.
In Uncle Nick (2015), the titular character uncovers and reveals his younger brother's affair with his stepdaughter.

Relationship unknown to the characters 

In Out of Season (1975), Joe (Cliff Robertson) reunites with his former lover Ann (Vanessa Redgrave) and they rekindle their love, but Ann's daughter Joanna (Susan George) attempts to seduce Joe away from Ann to spite her mother, causing Ann and Joanna to compete for Joe's affections. When Ann catches Joe and Joanna having sex, she reveals that Joe is Joanna's biological father. The ending is ambiguous whether Joe decided to remain with Ann or continue his incestuous relationship with Joanna.
In Obsession (1976), the protagonist Michael Courtland (Cliff Robertson) meets and falls in love with Sandra (Geneviève Bujold), a woman who looks exactly like his late wife. The two have a passionate relationship and become engaged at one point. In the end of the film, Sandra reveals to Courtland that she is his long-lost daughter Amy, and the father and daughter embrace.
In Stay as You Are (1978), architect Giulio (Marcello Mastroianni) begins an affair with college student Francesca (Nastassja Kinski). Giulio realizes that Francesca's deceased mother was a former flame he was with a year before Francesca was born, so Giulio tells her that she might be his daughter. Despite the possibility she might be Giulio's child, Francesca still continues their sexual relationship. Even when they end their affair, it is ultimately never revealed if Francesca was Giulio's biological daughter.
In the neo-noir religious-horror film Angel Heart (1987), New York City private investigator Harry Angel (Mickey Rourke) has sex with a woman named Epiphany (Lisa Bonet), unaware that she is his own daughter from a one-night stand 20 years prior.
In Three Seats for the 26th (1988), the fictionalized Yves Montand takes the young aspiring actress Marion (Mathilda May) as his leading lady for his autobiographical musical. After the musical's successful opening, the two sleep together. The next morning, Marion's mother shares to her that she was Yves' long-lost love and that Marion is his daughter. Marion arranges the reunion of her parents, and the happily reunited family leave on a train to Paris together.
In Voyager (1991), engineer Walter (Sam Shepard) falls in love with young woman Sabeth (Julie Delpy) during a cruise trip and begins a relationship with her. He meets the woman's mother, Hannah (Barbara Sukowa), who is his former girlfriend, and she confirms that Sabeth is his biological daughter. Sabeth does not realize the truth before she dies from a tragic accident.
In An Awfully Big Adventure (1995), the theatre troupe's most esteemed actor P.L. O'Hara (Alan Rickman) takes the virginity and initiates a sexual affair with the teenaged newcomer Stella (Georgina Cates), who reminds him of his former girlfriend who birthed him a child he never knew. He later visits her family and realizes that her missing mother was his lost love, making him her father; this troubling revelation leads O'Hara to accidentally cause his own death.
In Hierankl (2003), protagonist Lene meets her parents' close friend Goetz at her family reunion and begins a sexual affair with him. Lene's mother Rosemarie later reveals that she had an affair with Goetz as part of her open marriage and that Goetz is Lene's biological father, stunning Lene.
In the teen film 17 Again (2009), after being magically transformed back into his 17-year-old self in an attempt to mend the bond with his kids and high school sweetheart Scarlett (from all of whom he had become distant), Mike O'Donnell (Zac Efron) must fend off the advances of his teenage daughter Maggie (Michelle Trachtenberg) who becomes infatuated with him after he consoles her over her break-up. All the while she remains completely unaware that her love interest is her father.
In the pink film Tsumugi (2009), a rockstar meets a young teenager who introduces herself as his biggest fan. They share drinks together, and in his drunken stupor, the man tries to force her to have sex, but he could not continue due to intoxication. The girl later meets him again, introducing herself as his long-lost daughter, which stuns him.

Cousin
The practice of cousin marriage remains legal in many countries.

In Mansfield Park by Jane Austen (published 1814), Fanny ends up marrying her first cousin, Edmund, the son of her mother's sister, with whom she has been in love since he befriended her as a child. This relationship is explicit in the novel and in several adaptations of it: a BBC series starring Sylvestra Le Touzel in 1983; a 1999 film starring Frances O'Connor; a television adaptation in 2007 starring Billie Piper; and a chamber opera commissioned and produced by Heritage Opera in July–August 2011. The story contains no sexual component until they are married.
In the classic film Gone with the Wind (1939), based on the novel of the same name, distant cousins Ashley Wilkes and Melanie Hamilton fall in love, wed, and have two children together. Ashley's sister India Wilkes is also betrothed to her cousin Charles Hamilton, as is customary in the Wilkes family who traditionally wed their cousins. However, generations of inbreeding has resulted in many possible illness in the Wilkes family.
In The Blue Lagoon (1980), based on the novel of the same name, cousins Richard and Emmeline Lestrange grow up as lovers and have a child after being marooned on a tropical island for many years.
A major part of the Jerry Lee Lewis biographical film Great Balls of Fire! (1989) chronicles his controversial marriage to his 13-year-old cousin Myra.
A subplot in The Godfather Part III (1990) features Mary Corleone falling in love with her first cousin, the Godfather's heir, Vincent Mancini.
In Belle al Bar (1994), art restorer Leo reunites with his transgender cousin Giulia, and the cousins fall in love over the course of the film.
In The Portrait of a Lady (1996), Isabel Archer (Nicole Kidman) and her cousin Ralph (Martin Donovan) share a close friendship until, upon Ralph's deathbed, they each admit to being in love with the other. (This may not have been considered incest at the time the film is set.) One memorable scene is an interpolated dream sequence in which Isabel has an erotic fantasy involving her cousin.
In Utsab (2000) by Rituparno Ghosh, which follows a family reunion over the course of the Bengali festival of Durga Puja, the middle-aged Parul (Mamata Shankar) opposes the selling of the family mansion to her cousin Shishir (Dipankar De), with whom it is later revealed that she had an affair years earlier. The relationship was considered taboo and rejected by the rest of the family who had used physical violence to end the affair. Her son Joy (the product of Parul's unhappy marriage) also engages in a sexual relationship with his cousin Shampa (Arpita Pal).
In Jude (1996), starring Kate Winslet and Christopher Eccleston, based upon the Thomas Hardy novel Jude the Obscure, cousins Jude Fawley and Sue Bridehead burn for each other, but for various reasons the love is unrequited until Sue breaks down one evening and professes her love for Jude and they begin to live together. Only when Jude's estranged wife reenters his life does Sue finally give herself sexually to Jude and they have several children together.
In Mean Girls (2004), Karen Smith (Amanda Seyfried) is attracted to her (unseen but mentioned) cousin Seth Mosakowski and shares it openly, much to Gretchen's disgust. She even admits her cousin is a good kisser, having made out with him on several occasions, and tries to defend her potentially incestuous relationship by defiantly insisting that he's only her first cousin, unaware that first cousins are directly related to family. Against Gretchen's objections, Karen continues her relationship with Seth at the Halloween party.
In When Do We Eat? (2005), two cousins rekindle their longtime sexual affair during their family reunion.
Kissing Cousins (2008), starring Samrat Chakrabarti and Rebecca Hazlewood, is a "relatively" romantic comedy about a professional heartbreaker (and cynical bachelor) who teams up with his attractive cousin from the United Kingdom in order to deceive his friends into believing he is capable of a relationship.
In How I Live Now (2013), based on the novel of the same name, protagonist Daisy (Saoirse Ronan) falls in love with her cousin Eddie (George MacKay) and pursue a romantic relationship. When war breaks out, most of the film involves Daisy venturing out to find and reunite with Eddie.

Aunt
In The Perks of Being a Wallflower, (2012) based on the novel of the same name, the protagonist Charlie (Logan Lerman) is revealed to have suffered child sexual abuse from his mentally unstable Aunt Helen (Melanie Lynskey), who died in a car crash on a Christmas night when he was five. Flashbacks from long-repressed memories of the abuse eventually cause Charlie to suffer a nervous breakdown and wind up in a mental hospital.
In the French film Lila Says, the title character is sexually abused by her aunt.
In the extended cut of Wild Things (1998), Suzie Toller (Neve Campbell) is revealed to be Kelly Van Ryan's (Denise Richards) aunt (whose grandfather was a notorious philanderer). As part of Suzie's scheme to con her older half-sister Sandra Van Ryan (Kelly's mother) out of millions of dollars, she knowingly had sex with her own niece several times. No one except Suzie was ever aware of this, and Kelly never learns the truth.

Uncle
In Five Days One Summer (1980), the supposedly husband-wife protagonists, Douglas and Kate, are later revealed to be uncle and niece. Kate had been in love with her uncle since she was a little girl, and when she reunited with Douglas as an adult, they pursued an affair, with the film focusing on them pursuing their relationship by eloping to the Alps.
In Hellraiser (1987), antagonist Frank Cotton is initially the lover of his sister-in-law, Julia. However, he becomes sexually attracted to his niece Kirsty and remorselessly kills Julia in the process before he is led to his death by the Cenobites. In Hellbound: Hellraiser II (1988), Frank meets Kirsty again in hell and tries to force his niece to become his eternal sexual partner; Kristy kisses him to distract him before he is destroyed by Julia.
In The Adventures of Priscilla, Queen of the Desert (1994), Felicia describes sabotaging a creepy uncle in childhood.
In Bad Company (1995), the first extortion mission where Wells (Ellen Barkin) and Crowe (Laurence Fishburne) work together involving breaking into a powerful businessman's home to record him having sex with his niece, with the recording used as blackmail for him to step down from his position. The niece later secretly approaches them for her payment, as she was in on the plan to extort her uncle.
In Marianna Ucrìa (1997), the titular character is a young deaf & mute noblewoman who is forced to marry her significantly older wealthy uncle Pietro at the age of 13. Despite her young age, she bears Pietro's four children and remained married to her uncle until his death. In the end of the film, she reconciles that her muteness was caused in part by Pietro sexually abusing her as a child.
In the Bollywood film Monsoon Wedding (2001), one of the subplots involves an uncle who abused the bride's cousin Ria as a child, and now she's worried that he's doing the same thing to an even younger cousin.
In the Chilean film Sexo con Amor (2003), one of the primary characters, Emilio, has his niece Susan visit him and stay at his home. Susan admits that she had a crush on him since she was a young teenager and playfully seduces him throughout her stay. When Emilio's wife and son are away, Emilio and Susan succumb to their desires and they have sex on top of a washing machine.
In Blood and Chocolate (2007), seeking a member of his pack to join him as his alpha female in accordance with pack law, the alpha male werewolf Gabriel (Oliver Martinez) desires to take the reluctant orphan Vivian (Agnes Bruckner) as his mate despite his knowledge of their being uncle and niece.
In Catherine Hardwicke's teen drama Thirteen (2003), Evie (Nikki Reed) was molested by her uncle, leading to his doing seven years in jail. The abuse is given or implied as the explanation of why she indulges in drugs, sex, and shoplifting.
In Stoker (2013), a teenage girl and her long-lost serial killer uncle become infatuated with each other, with the girl copying her uncle's murderous tendencies.
In The Judge (2014), lawyer Hank Palmer (Robert Downey Jr.) meets and flirts with bartender Carla (Leighton Meester) and later makes out with her. After learning that her mother is his ex-girlfriend Sam (Vera Farmiga), Hank believes he is Carla's father while she continues to flirt with him. Sam later reveals that Carla's father is Hank's brother Glen (Vincent D'Onofrio), making Carla his niece.
In the mystery/thriller film Unfriended (2015), a series of e-mails reveal that bullying victim Laura Barns (Heather Sossaman) had a troubled relationship with her uncle and it was assumed by her former close friends that she was sexually abused by him. Though not explicitly stated, Blaire tries to tell Mitch that Laura was abused, perhaps sexually, by her uncle. The implications are there, even if she cannot bring herself to complete the sentence.
In Red Sparrow (2018), Dominicka (Jennifer Lawrence) is forced to become a Russian intelligence officer by her manipulative uncle Ivan (Matthias Schoenaerts), who harbors incestuous feelings for her.

Grandparent 

In The Goddess of 1967 (2000), BG (Rose Byrne) was sexually abused as a child by her grandfather, who is also her biological father since her mother was also abused by him.
 In Some Beasts (2019), the family patriarch Alejandro, in a drunken stupor, rapes his granddaughter Consuelo.

Television

Several kinds of incest on the same series
The 1980s American soap opera Dynasty featured a storyline wherein Fallon Colby and Adam Carrington become attracted to one another, eventually sharing a kiss, not realizing that they are, in fact, sister and brother. Fallon would also go on to marry and divorce two of her second cousins, Jeff and Miles Colby.
In the FOX television drama House, the (episode "Fools for Love") featured two young patients, a husband and wife, who share the same symptoms. Later it is revealed that they are agnate half-siblings suffering from hereditary angioedema inherited from their father. In the episode "Skin Deep", a teenage supermodel confesses to initiating an incestuous relationship with her father simply to get what she wants. In the episode "Sex Kills", a teenage boy suffering from an odd fixation toward cows and inappropriate "messages" admits that his attractive stepmother is coming on to him, and turns to Dr. House for prescriptions to kill his sex drive until he graduates and moves out.
In The Simpsons, Springfield's rival town Shelbyville was founded specifically to allow men to marry their cousins because, according to Shelbyville Manhattan, the founder of the city, "they're so attractive". There was also the relationship between Cletus Spuckler and his wife Brandine, who may be siblings, cousins, mother and son, or even father and daughter.
In Family Guy, the Griffin family would often be caught in incestuous scenarios towards each other, the most examples are when Chris and Meg did Seven Minutes in Heaven at a Halloween party, Stewie kissing a young Lois in the past, Meg develops feelings for Brian and Stewie getting himself pregnant with Brian's DNA where he gave birth to human-dog hybrids.
In a cutaway gag parodying Back to the Future, Marty decides to have sex with his past mother Lorraine which resulted him having a deformed son.
 In American Dad, Roger lies to Steve that he was kidnapped as a baby and immediately hurts Stan (who was temporary crippled) with a bookshelf and kissed Hayley on the mouth. In another episode Steve unknowingly masturbated on a naked painting of Hayley in the bathroom.
In HBO's Rome, Octavia seduces her brother Octavian hoping to learn some of his secrets during pillow-talk, and Octavian is once wrongly accused of having an affair with his great uncle, Julius Caesar.
In the crime drama CSI, 
The quadruple-murder episode "Blood Drops" shows that a teenage girl named Tina (Allison Lange) was sexually abused by her father from the age of six with the knowledge of her family, and that her little sister Brenda (Dakota Fanning) is actually her half-sister/daughter born from this abuse. Brenda was later also sexually abused by her father/grandfather, prompting Tina to have him and their entire family murdered.
In the episode "Table Stakes", a young wealthy married couple, Patrick and Amanda Haynes (Shawn Christian and Elizabeth Lackey), are discovered to be brother and sister in an incestuous relationship, posing under different aliases in attempts to kill numerous rich socialites for their money. 
In the season two episode "Got Murder?", a teenage girl, Nora Easton (Evan Rachel Wood), is suspected in the murder of her father's girlfriend. She is revealed to be the killer, having had an incestuous attraction towards her father which motivated her to impulsively kill the girlfriend. Nora's desire to carry her father's baby causes her body to undergo a "false pregnancy" despite being a virgin.
In "Burden of Proof", a shy teenage girl, Jodie Bradley (Sara Paxton), is discovered to have been sexually abused by her father Russ. When Jodie tries to get help from her innocent stepfather Mike, her father kills the stepfather to silence Jodie before he is finally arrested by the authorities. 
In the Season 10 episode "Lost and Found", a missing teenage girl, Emily Marsh (Mackenzie Mauzy), is revealed to have been raped and sexually abused by her maternal uncle Bill (Christopher Shyer), resulting in the teen giving birth to her cousin/son and accidentally killing her younger brother when he accuses her of consensual incest with their uncle.
In the CBS sitcom The Big Bang Theory, after his father abandoned him and his mother when he was a little boy, Howard Wolowitz maintained a close yet dysfunctional relationship with his mother continually even into his adult years, causing his friends to mock Wolowitz, characterizing his relationship with his mother as an unresolved Oedipus complex. In season two, having ingested "magic cookies", Howard confesses to having lost his virginity to his cousin Jeannie in the backseat of his uncle's car during the uncle's funeral.
In the TvLand sitcom Hot In Cleveland, Victoria Chase starred in Edge of Tomorrow, where her character Honor St. Raven shoots, has sex with, and leaves her brother to die in an abandoned diamond mine. In episode 2, Joy goes on a date with a younger man, and after he reveals that his birth mother gave him up for adoption, Joy begins to fear she may be accidentally dating her own son. In season 5, Joy goes to meet a cousin she has not seen in years and instantly becomes attracted to him, prompting her to overlook the "taboo" nature of her crush and even considers dating him and having his kids, much to her roommates' disgust.

Incestuous families
The FOX television drama The X-Files featured an episode, "Home", in which a family in the real Pennsylvania town of Home had pursued incestuous relationships for several generations, and as a result, developed a multitude of genetic deformities.
The HBO series Game of Thrones has several examples of incestuous families; House Targaryen was known for practicing incest among their siblings in order to keep the bloodline pure, as well as to maintain control over their dragons. As a result, several cases of the Targaryen household showed signs of mental illness as the centuries passed. By the time the series starts, Cersei, wife and queen to Robert Baratheon, and her brother Jaime Lannister, who have been carrying on a longtime incestuous affair, have three children born of incest: Joffrey Baratheon, Myrcella Baratheon, and Tommen Baratheon.

Sibling incest

British series
I, Claudius was a 1976 BBC Television adaptation of Robert Graves's I, Claudius and Claudius the God. In it, the sordid lives of the Caesars are detailed, including the historical incestuous relationship between Caligula and his sister Drusilla.
The soap opera Brookside ran a controversial storyline featuring consensual sex between the two sibling characters Nat and Georgia Simpson, in 1997.
In "The Killings at Badger's Drift", an episode of Midsomer Murders, an old woman discovers a brother and sister in an incestuous relationship.
The soap opera Family Affairs featured a storyline involving Gavin and Polly Arnold, a brother and sister in a consensual incestuous relationship.
In the Channel 4 series Coming Up, a woman who is obsessed with breaking social taboos seduces her brother during the 7 July 2005 London bombings. They eventually part ways as they realize that they cannot be a normal couple.
In the sketch comedy series Bo! in the USA, a spin-off from Bo' Selecta!, siblings Avid Merrion (Leigh Francis) and Sacha Merrion (Barunka O'Shaughnessy) are married.

American series
The television series Prison Break (2005) portrays the character Theodore "T-Bag" Bagwell (Robert Knepper) as the product of incestuous rape, specifically that of his Down syndrome-afflicted aunt by his father; he was also molested by his father. Siblings President Caroline Reynolds and Terrence Steadman were also incestuous lovers.
Cesare Borgia and Lucretia Borgia share an incestuous relationship on the TV series The Borgias. The real Lucretia Borgia was accused of such an affair after the marriage with her first husband was annulled. However, these accusations have never been historically proven.
In the finale episode of the third season of FX Network's television drama Nip/Tuck, Quentin Costa (Bruno Campos) and Kit McGraw (Rhona Mitra) are exposed as incestuous lovers, of likewise incestuous parents. This discovery comes soon after Quentin is unmasked as the serial killer The Carver, the main antagonist of the third season, along with his accomplice, Kit. In the sixth season, it is Matt Macnamara who has intercourse with a girl who turns out to be his half-sister.
The sitcom It's Always Sunny in Philadelphia features brothers Doyle and Liam McPoyle, who serve as rivals of the main characters and are shown to have an incestuous relationship with each other and the rest of their family. This is evidenced by the family sharing certain traits, most notably unibrows.
The television series The Fosters depicts an on-again-off-again relationship between foster/adoptive siblings Brandon Foster and Callie Jacobs-Foster, who fall in love but repeatedly break up for the sake of Callie getting adopted by Brandon's family.
In the CW television series Riverdale, some time after Jason Blossom's murder, Polly Cooper reveals she had been sleeping with Jason and is pregnant. Her father Hal goes nuts and demands she get an abortion. The rest of the family assumes this is because the Blossoms and Coopers are feuding families, but Hal reveals that his grandfather was the brother of Jason's great-grandfather (but, estranged from the Blossom family had changed his last name to Cooper, which is what started the feud in the first place), which meant that unbeknownst to each other, Jason and Polly were third cousins. Alice does the math and realizes to her horror, and that of the Cooper family, that Jason and Polly's unborn babies are inbred and "Blossoms by blood". Despite this revelation, Polly decides that she does not care, and will carry the pregnancies to term.
In True Blood, vampire Bill Compton finds out his human one-night stand Portia is actually his third great-granddaughter. Bill is the only one who is grossed out by this. Portia is more than willing to continue their relationship (and great sex), citing logical reasons why this should not affect them (e.g., their genetic differences are about the same as with any other person; there's no risk of children since he's a vampire; and most states are rethinking their cousin-marriage laws anyway). Bill then hypnotizes her into having a screaming fit every time she sees him. Another main character, Sookie, was molested by her great-uncle Bartlett. As in the book series, Bill kills him in revenge for what he did to Sookie. Sookie later learns that Bartlett had left her everything in his will.
In Hope & Faith, Faith Fairfield discovers in a court case that the elder man and his stepdaughter testifying against her mother are lovers plotting to put her mother in prison so they can be together. Against judge's orders, Faith exposes their plot, as well as their incestuous relationship, to the court, leaving the old man and his stepdaughter no choice but to confess their crimes.
In The Secret Life of the American Teenager, Adrian Lee meets her stepbrother Max for the first time and the two have sex and begin dating upon feeling a connection. However, her father catches them in the act and forbids them from seeing each other. Also, Ricky Underwood reveals to Amy that both he and his mother were sexually abused by his father, Bob Underwood, when he was a child.
In Tales from the Crypt's Season Two episode "Four-Sided Triangle", a beautiful but seemingly mad farm hand (Patricia Arquette), is sexually abused by her own father, prompting the woman to seek help from a scarecrow she believes to be alive. In the episode "Seance'", a young woman engages in an incestuous relationship with her distant cousin simply to steal money from him. In the final season's premiere episode "Fatal Caper", an elderly man (Leslie Phillips) close to death discovers that the beautiful young woman (Natasha Richardson) he attempts to sleep with is not only a transsexual but also his own long-lost son whom he has not seen in years.
 Several episodes of Criminal Minds dealt with incest themes:
 In Season 2, episode 5, "Seven Seconds", an abducted five-year-old girl is revealed to have been sexually abused by her uncle; her aunt (who refuses to believe her husband is a pedophile) blames her niece for their failing marriage and proceeds to 'remove her from the picture' by abducting her. The niece is found bound and gagged, unconscious but alive, by the FBI. 
 In Season 4, Episode 19, "House On Fire", after the deaths of their parents in a tragic fire, orphans Tommy and Tina Wheeler maintain a close relationship growing up due to the both of them being emotionally traumatized from the fire. Eventually their bond develops into an incestuous relationship and after they are caught getting close in a movie theater, the townspeople spread rumors about it. This makes Tommy go on the run, change his name, and start numerous fires, killing those people who had forbidden him and Tina to be together in the first place. 
 The episode "Taboo" had an interesting take: the unsub was adopted as a baby by a single mother with a biological teenage daughter. The daughter was hypersexual, thanks to a brain injury, and the boy grew up attracted to her, even spying on her as she had sex with his friends. When she takes him to a lover's lane for privacy, he gleefully makes his move, pointing out that they are not siblings by blood, so he believes it's time for him to get his turn. She then reveals the truth: she's not his sister, she's his mother. The boy snaps, blaming his "sister" and "mother" for turning him into an abomination.
In Season 9, episode 20 "Blood Relations", crime suspects Malachi Lee and Magdalene "Cissy" Lee-Morgan are discovered to have had a consensual incestuous relationship when they were teenagers. The two occasionally had sex in a shack in the woods, and after accidentally conceiving a child together, they kept it secret, fearing their parents' reactions. Soon after giving birth, they gave the child up for adoption. That same inbred child grew up to become the "Killer Woodsman" lurking in the woods and killing numerous people.
In The Fresh Prince of Bel-Air season five episode "To Thine Own Self Be Blue... and Gold", siblings Carlton Banks and Hilary Banks try online dating in hopes of finding suitable matches, only to discover too late that they've been paired up with each other. Though the siblings are reluctant to go through with their date, they change their minds when they find a briefcase filled with money (belonging to their father) and decide "even though we're related, we could still have a good time".
In Married...with Children season four episode "You Gotta Know When to Fold 'Em", after the family goes to Las Vegas to confront Peggy and Marcy for overcharging Al's credit card in Las Vegas, it is revealed that Kelly can predict the dice rolls at craps: at every roll, Kelly's mind goes blank and she knows what the dice are going to roll — whereupon Kelly's brother Bud declares his love for her and proposes on the spot, realizing that, together, they can win a lot of money.
In the teen drama series Pretty Little Liars, antagonist and fellow mean girl Jenna Marshall is revealed to have incestuous feelings towards her older stepbrother Toby Cavanaugh. Jenna is obsessed with Toby and has blackmailed him into a sexual relationship in the past, and then blackmails him again to keep their affair secret, threatening to tell everyone that he forced himself on her. (This is reversed in the book series, in which Toby forces Jenna into having sex with him.) After Toby returns from juvie, Jenna seems to have feelings for him still, since she becomes jealous every time Emily, Spencer, or any other girl is seen talking to him.
In the American sitcom Life in Pieces episode "Annulled Roommate Pill Shower" (2016), Clementine's unusual parents, partners Mary-Lynn (Megan Mullaby) and Spencer (Nick Offerman), are revealed to be siblings in a happy incestuous relationship, a fact that they share openly.
In the television series Degrassi Takes Manhattan, Fiona kisses Declan in an attempt to make Holly J. jealous. This results in a rumor about "Twincest".
In Beverly Hills, 90210, Valerie Malone is revealed to have been sexually assaulted by her father multiple times, this having led Valerie to kill him, which is the reason Val had moved to L.A. in the first place.
In the How I Met Your Mother episode "The Over-Correction", Lily's father Mickey starts hooking up with Marshall's mother Judy, which disgust both of them due to them being married which makes their parents in-laws.
In the HBO Max animated series Jellystone!, Jonny Quest and Hadji are portrayed as adults within the town of Jellystone, they are depicted as a gay couple rather than being brothers.

Japanese animation

Koi Kaze is about the relationship between a man and his adolescent sister, whom he has not seen for many years. The series attempts a serious take on the subject, exploring the consequences of their relationship and its impact on the people close to them.
Although sexual innuendo or love infatuation between siblings is a common plot device in many anime stories, series like Angel Sanctuary, Boku wa Imouto ni Koi o Suru, Kono Naka ni Hitori, Imouto ga Iru!, Yosuga no Sora, Aki Sora, Ore no Imouto ga Konna ni Kawaii Wake ga Nai, Onegai Twins, Nisemonogatari and Penguin Drum directly deal with the subject of incest.

Incest involving twins
In the HBO original series Game of Thrones, twins Jaime and Cersei Lannister share a consensual incestuous relationship. Their relationship began at a very early age and was known to their mother, while their father learns of it only later in the series. The twins have three children together, who are (at least at the beginning of the series) widely regarded as the children of Cersei and her husband the King, Robert Baratheon. The show also features other incestuous relationships.
In the CW television series Riverdale, there is a lot of incest subtext between twins Cheryl and Jason Blossom. The pilot starts with them getting into a boat together, acting more like a romantic couple than siblings. She refers to him as her soulmate at his memorial. The revelation in Season Three of their mother Penelope having been adopted and groomed by the Blossoms to be Clifford's bride suggests an intentional manipulation by the Blossom family.
In the television series 8 Simple Rules, after Aunt Maggie gets a water bra and becomes more buxom, Rory is more than eager and willing to continue asking his aunt for more hugs just so he can feel her chest.

Half-siblings incest
One Hollyoaks plot has dealt with incest between two members of the Ashworth family, Rhys Ashworth and his half-sister Beth Clement. They did not know they were half brother and sister when they began seeing each other. Upon finding out that they were related when their dad died, they tried to halt the relationship, but in the end could not stay away despite Rhys moving into a relationship with Mercedes McQueen and Beth moving into a relationship with Rhys' best friend, Gilly Roach. When Beth is planning to be married to Gilly, they decide they must leave Hollyoaks, as they cannot end their relationship, and they see no other way to be together.
In the British soap opera Emmerdale, characters Ryan and Maisie are in a romantic and sexual relationship until it is revealed that they share the same father.
In the CBS horror series Harper's Island, it is revealed in the last episode that main characters Abby Mills and Henry Dunn are half-siblings, sharing the same mother even though the mother had given Henry up for adoption. Henry learns of this from his biological father, and is still in love with Abby. However, when Abby finds out, she calls him sick and wants to leave him.
In the FOX television series Two and a Half Men, Charlie Harper has a one-night stand with a woman named Gloria, who is revealed to be his and Alan's half sister from when their mother's husband had an affair with another woman.
In the FX original series Sons of Anarchy, protagonist Jax Teller and Irish IRA family member Trinity Ashby were developing a romantic interest in each other while Jax and SAMCRO were in Belfast, Northern Ireland. Before they had sex, both of their mothers walked in and were forced to tell them that they are paternal half siblings as a result of an affair between Jax's father and Trinity's mother.
In the BBC drama Taboo, upon James Delaney's return to London, he reunites with his half-sister, Zilpha Geary, with whom he had an incestuous relationship in their youth, which was forcibly ended by their father when Zilpha became pregnant with James' child and James left for Africa. Though Zilpha initially rebukes James' pursuit of her, she is undeniably drawn to him, something that adds to the anger her husband already feels towards her for not giving him a child. When Zilpha eventually kills her husband, she and James resume their relationship.
In the television series Bored to Death, the main character Jonathan has sex with a woman whom he later finds out is his half sister, their father being the same sperm donor.
In the CSI: Miami episode "Divorce Party", the detectives learn that a murder victim had been living a double life, raising a son, Heath, with one woman and a daughter, Brianna, with another. When the two children are taken in for questioning, they reveal that they began a relationship after meeting each other at a party. They were unaware that they were related until Heath witnessed their father visiting Brianna while he was supposed to be away on business. Even after this discovery, they decided to continue their relationship. Subsequently, they found out that Brianna had become pregnant by Heath. When their father learned of their relationship and pregnancy, he condemned them and pressured them to get an abortion, prompting them to murder him to protect their child.
In Élite, Lu Montesinos (Danna Paola) and her half-brother Valerio (Jorge López) have a sexual relationship which eventually leads to consequences.

Parent/children incest

Father/daughter incest
In the 2005 episode of Law & Order: Criminal Intent named "Death Roe", a famous cook commits various crimes as he maintains an incestual relationship with his daughter.
With the show's premise on punishing sexual crimes, Law & Order: Special Victims Unit features several episodes centered on incest:
In "A Single Life," the dead victim and her sister was revealed to be sexually abused as children by their wealthy father.
In "Pandora," a sexual predator shares child pornography of his young daughter, whom he repeatedly raped.
In "Taboo", the detectives uncover that a powerful politician has been having an affair with his daughter which produced two children that both were abandoned to die.
In "Stranger," a woman escapes captivity from being sexually abused by her father before disguising herself as a missing person to find a new family.
In "Send in the Clowns," a teacher and his student are secret lovers, with them faking the student's kidnapping so they can elope and pursue their relationship. When they are uncovered and arrested, the student's mother reveals the student is the teacher's biological daughter. The teacher is horrified, but the student is fascinated instead even theorising that being father and daughter is the reason they felt attracted in the first place, leading the detectives to theorize that she has genetic sexual attraction.
In "The Good Girl," a teenager is impregnated from her stepfather's rape.
In the 2009 episode of Law & Order: Criminal Intent named "Family Values". Paul Devildis develops an incestuous attraction towards his daughter Kathy. His deep religious beliefs make him believe that everyone else, as well, is attracted to her in a lustful way, and are therefore sinners. He goes on a killing spree under the belief that he is doing God's work.
In Twin Peaks, David Lynch's 1990–91 cult hit, 17-year-old Laura Palmer, whose brutal murder causes the events depicted in the series to unfold, has been sexually abused on a regular basis by a demonic entity referred to as Bob, who has taken possession of her father Leland.
In CBS's Numb3rs, episode 12 of season 3 ("Nine Wives") features the discovery of incest in a polygamous fundamentalist cult. A teenage victim, Josephine Kirtland, learns that her mother, Emmanueline (played by Anne Dudek), is also her half-sister.
In the television series 21 Jump Street episode "Blindsided", a teenage girl named Diane (Sherilyn Fenn), who is being sexually abused by her father, repeatedly tries to get help from police and social workers. They repeatedly fail to help her because her abusive father is a police captain who uses his police influence to repeatedly dismiss her case. Things are made even worse by the fact that the girl has also already lost her mother, and that the father has begun abusing the girl's younger sister.
Grace's backstory in American Horror Story: Asylum reveals that she murdered her father for molesting her, and her stepmother for not doing anything about it.
In the television series Brookside Trevor Jordache abused his daughters.
In Desperate Housewives, it is revealed that when Gabrielle (Eva Longoria) was fifteen, her abusive stepfather Alejandro once came home drunk and raped her. Nobody believed Gabrielle when she tried to report it, especially her own mother.
In The Walking Dead, abuse by Sofia's father, Ed, is implied. At one point, he grabs her arm when the two are alone in a tent, and he has been accused of looking at her the wrong way, and Carol mentions that Ed "looked at Sophia in ways a father should never look at his daughter".
In the third season of This Is Us episode "Sometimes", Zoe Baker reveals to her boyfriend Kevin Pearson that she was sexually abused by her father when she was growing up, and this is why she does not want to see the unnamed man, talk about him, or open up her budding relationship with Kevin in any way.
In the series Veronica Mars 1x07 episode "The Girl Next Door", it's discovered that the reason why Sarah (Jessica Chastain) runs away and does not want to see her parents or discuss her unborn child's paternity was because she was raped, and it was her stepfather Randall who impregnated her.
In the Netflix series Daredevil, a father is overheard molesting his daughter in her room at night when his wife is sleeping. Overhearing them prompts Matt Murdock to take up vigilantism and get revenge for the girl when child protective services could not take action.
In Beverly Hills, 90210, character Valerie Malone was repeatedly raped by her father as a child, and her mother blamed her for it.

Mother/son incest
The British comedy Green Wing features a mother and son, Joanna and Guy, sleeping together, albeit unknowingly as Guy was abandoned by Joanna as a baby.
In Boardwalk Empire, Gillian Darmody (Gretchen Mol) was a dancer who was raped at the age of 13 and gave birth to Jimmy Darmody, (Michael Pitt). Their relationship is unusually close and a flashback in the second-season episode "Under God's Power She Flourishes" reveals that Gillian had seduced Jimmy when he was a student at Princeton, leading to his dropping out and enlisting to fight in World War I.
In the FX series American Horror Story: Coven, Kyle has an incestuous relationship with his mother, shown when he is brought home after being resurrected. It is not revealed whether the relationship is consensual on Kyle's part, and it seems that his mother is incredibly in love with him.
In the FX series American Horror Story: Asylum, escaped serial killer Johnny Morgan harbors an incestuous fixation on his mother Lana Winters. His grudge towards his mother stems from an unresolved Oedipus complex because she abandoned him as a child and neglected his emotional childhood needs. This spilled into his personal life, as he kidnapped and skinned numerous women alive, and hired post-partum prostitutes to breastfeed him during sexual intercourse, at one point even masturbating while thinking of his childhood memories of his mother.
In American Horror Story: Roanoke, it is implied that the matriarch of the Polk clan has sex with her sons.
In the CW television series Smallville, antagonists Genevieve Teague and her son Jason Teague are revealed to have an ongoing incestuous relationship as was mentioned by Lionel Luthor many times, who took pride in mocking their illicit affair, terming it an Oedipus complex.
In Animal Kingdom, Janine "Smurf" Cody (Ellen Barkin), the protective matriarch of her family, who maintains a close relationship with each of her grownup sons, harbors a borderline-incestuous love toward them as shown in one particular episode where she openly ogles her sons' shirtless bodies during the family's summer car wash.

Cousin incest
In The Simpsons, Bart's friend Milhouse is the son of Kirk and luann Van Houten, who are actually cousins as mentioned in "Let's Go Fly a Coot".
One storyline in the BBC soap EastEnders involves a romance between cousins Lauren and Joey Branning.
In the Seinfeld episode "The Junk Mail" (1997), George dates his cousin Lisa in an attempt to further enrage his parents over their differences.
In the How I Met Your Mother episode "Okay Awesome", Barney dances with a girl at a nightclub and doesn't see her face until she turns around, whereupon he sees she is his cousin Leslie. They both run away from the club in disgust.
The sitcom Arrested Development features a recurring theme in which George Michael develops a crush on his cousin Maeby. While the two do come close to forming a relationship, it is suggested many times throughout the series that Maeby may have been adopted and that she and George Michael are not related by blood at all. Later story lines feature Maeby developing a relationship with a classmate of hers named Steve Holt, only to discover that he, too, is her cousin.
In Muhteşem Yüzyıl:
In season 2, Ayşe Hafsa Sultan (Nebahat Çehre) tries to arrange the marriage between her niece Aybige Hatun (Ezgi Eyüboğlu) and her grandson Şehzade Mustafa (Mehmet Günsür).
In season 3, Esmahan Sultan (Ecem Çalık) falls in love with her first cousin Şehzade Mehmed (Gürbey İleri).
In season 4, Şehzade Bayezid (Aras Bulut İynemli) and Şehzade Cihangir (Tolga Sarıtaş) fall in love with their first cousin Huricihan Sultan (Burcu Özberk). Bayezid and Huricihan marry secretly.
 In the That '70s Show episode "Eric's Hot Cousin", Eric's cousin Penny comes to visit. He, his parents, and his friends are all stunned to see she has grown into an attractive woman. She later tells him she loves him and that she's adopted (making them not related). He agrees to sleep with her in his basement where he is caught by his parents which gets him in trouble. She reveals she was lying about being adopted and it was all part of a prank as revenge for when they were kids.
 In Ramy, the titular character and his cousin Amani were in a relationship in between the first and second seasons; they still have lingering and complicated feelings for each other after their breakup.

Other kinds of incest
In the Australian soap opera Neighbours, Nicola West pursues a relationship with her adoptive nephew Riley Parker.
In the final season of Game of Thrones, Daenerys Targaryen begins a relationship with her nephew Jon Snow.
EastEnders featured a storyline between sisters Zoe Slater and Kat Slater and their uncle Harry Slater in which Zoe discovers that Kat, whom she thought was her sister, is actually her mother who had been sexually abused by her uncle Harry, resulting in her becoming pregnant with Zoe.
In the Futurama episode "Roswell that Ends Well" (2001), the crew is sent back in time to the 1940s while watching a supernova occur. With the loss of all guidance systems, their ship crash-lands at Roswell, where Philip J. Fry meets his grandfather, Enos. Professor Farnsworth warns Fry not to interfere with anything, lest he disrupt his own timeline. However, in an attempt to prevent his grandfather's death, Fry locks him in a cabin out in the middle of nowhere – which unknown to him is a nuclear test zone — resulting in his grandfather's death. Soon afterward, he quickly becomes entangled in his young grandmother's emotional despair and ends up sleeping with her. He rationalizes this by thinking that, since he still exists, the people he had thought were his grandparents must not have been. The Professor, after discovering the two, then informs Fry that he is his own grandfather (a reference to the famous grandfather paradox of time travel). A later episode ("The Day the Earth Stood Stupid") cites this scenario as the cause for Fry's lack of a cognitive function called the Delta Brain Wave, enabling him to be immune to an invasion of intelligence-absorbing flying brains.
In Banshee, crime lord Kai Proctor takes his niece Rebecca under his wing as both of them were banished from their Amish community. They go closer over time and they eventually become incestuous lovers.
In the Marvel series Luke Cage, antagonist Mariah Dillard was sexually abused by her great-uncle Pete, which led to the birth of her daughter Tilda Johnson.
In the miniseries Mare of Easttown, a major mystery in the series is who fathered the son of murder victim Erin. The father is revealed to be John Ross, a cousin of her father's, whom she met at a family reunion and later had an affair with.
In episode 4 of House of the Dragon, Princess Rhaenyra Targaryen makes out with her uncle Daemon Targaryen while in a brothel.

See also
Incest in popular culture
Incest in literature
Incest in the Bible
Incest in folklore
Incest pornography

References

Incest in fiction